Farrar Corporation is an American iron foundry and machining company.

About Farrar Corporation
The Farrar Corporation has two locations: a ductile iron foundry and machining facility in Norwich, Kansas and a second machining facility in Manhattan, Kansas.  Farrar has been in operation since 1931 and specializes in machined ductile iron castings and assemblies.  The foundry's capabilities include casting design and technical assistance, casting pattern design, casting production, heat treating, casting painting and assembly as well as finish machining.

Ductile Iron Foundry
The Farrar Corporation has poured all grades of ASTM A536 Ductile Iron since 1967 and specializes in castings of 2 lbs - 70 lbs in production runs of 100-100,000. 

The foundry is located in Norwich, Kansas with an adjoining machine shop that can provide its customers with turn-key casting solutions.  The foundry frequently provides prototypes for customers' ductile iron castings that can help identify design flaws and weaknesses before that casting run is put into production. 

The plant is capable of handling 70 tons of melt per day with an anticipated expansion to 120 tons.

Ductile Iron Specifications
Ductile iron is an economical alternative to steel due to its increased strength, improved performance and reduced cost.  Below is a chart of the foundry's ductile (nodular) iron specifications:

Ductile Iron Machining Facilities
The Farrar Corporation's machine shop specializes in CNC turning, CNC milling, drilling, broaching and gear cutting.  With facilities in Norwich and Manhattan.

References

External links
 Farrar Corporation Official Website
 Ductile Iron Society Official Website
 American Foundry Society Official Website

Companies based in Kansas
1931 establishments in Kansas